Eya Guezguez (12 March 2005 – 10 April 2022) was a Tunisian sailor. She competed in the 49er FX event at the 2020 Summer Olympics.

Career
Eya Guezguez competed in the 49er FX event at the 2020 Summer Olympics, along with her twin sister Sarra. Eya was the youngest Tunisian at the Games, as Sarra was two minutes older than Eya, and Eya was the team's skipper. The pair finished 21st and last in the event, and did not compete in the final three races of the event.

Death
On 10 April 2022, Guezguez drowned whilst training, at the age of 17. She had been training with her sister when their boat capsized in the waters near Tunis, due to high winds. An investigation into her death has been launched.

References

External links
 
 
 

2005 births
2022 deaths
Tunisian female sailors (sport)
Olympic sailors of Tunisia
Sailors at the 2020 Summer Olympics – 49er FX
Twin sportspeople
Tunisian twins
Boating accident deaths
Accidental deaths in Tunisia
People from Sousse Governorate
21st-century Tunisian women